The 2014 season was Helsingin Jalkapalloklubi's 106th competitive season. HJK is the most successful Finnish football club with 26 Finnish Championships, 11 Finnish Cup titles, 4 Finnish League Cup titles and one appearance in the UEFA Champions League Group Stages.

Squad

Out on loan

Transfers

Winter

In:

Out:

Summer

In:

Out:

Competitions

Veikkausliiga

Results summary

Results

League table

Finnish Cup

League Cup

Group stage

Knockout stages

UEFA Champions League

Qualifying phase

UEFA Europa League

Qualifying phase

Group stage

Squad statistics

Appearances and goals

|-
|colspan="14"|Players from Klubi-04 who appeared:

|-
|colspan="14"|Players who left HJK during the season:

|}

Goal scorers

Clean Sheets

Disciplinary record

References

2014
Hjk